Crutcher Rock is a nunatak rising to about ,  south-southwest of Staack Nunatak in the Yee Nunataks. It was named by the Advisory Committee on Antarctic Names in 1987 after Mont C. Crutcher, a United States Geological Survey cartographer who worked in the field at Ross Ice Shelf, South Pole Station, Byrd Glacier, and Dome Charlie in 1974–75.

References 

Nunataks of Palmer Land